Holosteus (meaning "complete skeleton") is a genus of prehistoric barracudina found in Eocene and Oligocene-aged marine strata.

References
http://paleodb.org/cgi-bin/bridge.pl?action=checkTaxonInfo&taxon_no=35570&is_real_user=1

Paralepididae
Ypresian genus first appearances
Oligocene genus extinctions